The Abortion Act 1967 is an Act of the Parliament of the United Kingdom legalising abortions on certain grounds by registered practitioners, and regulating the tax-paid provision of such medical practices through the National Health Service (NHS).

It was introduced by David Steel as a Private Member's Bill, but was backed by the government, who appointed the president of the Royal College of Obstetricians and Gynaecologists, Sir John Peel, to chair a medical advisory committee that reported in favour of passing the bill.

After a further heated political and moral debate, under a free vote, it was passed on 27 October 1967, coming into effect on 27 April 1968.

The Act made abortion legal on a wide number of grounds in all of Great Britain (but not Northern Ireland) up to 28 weeks' gestation.

The Act does not extend to Northern Ireland, where abortion was illegal unless the doctor acted "only to save the life of the mother", or if continuing the pregnancy would have resulted in the pregnant woman becoming a "physical or mental wreck". The situation was the same as it was in England before the introduction of the Abortion Act 1967.

At midnight, on 21 October 2019, due to the Northern Ireland Assembly failing to restore devolution, sections 58 and 59 of the Offences Against the Person Act 1861 were repealed, decriminalising abortion. As such, there is no need for the exemptions in the Abortion Act 1967 to extend to Northern Ireland.

Later laws 

Since 1967, members of Parliament have introduced a number of private member's bills to change the abortion law. Five resulted in substantive debate (1975, 1976, 1979, 1988, and 1990), but all failed. The Lane Committee investigated the workings of the Act in 1974 and declared its support.

Human Fertilisation and Embryology Act 1990 

Changes to the Abortion Act 1967 were introduced in Parliament through the Human Fertilisation and Embryology Act 1990. The time limits were lowered from 28 to 24 weeks for most cases on the grounds that medical technology had advanced sufficiently to justify the change. Restrictions were removed for late abortions in cases of risk to life, fetal abnormality, or grave physical and mental injury to the woman. Some Members of Parliament claimed not to have been aware of the vast change the decoupling of the Infant Life Preservation Act 1929 would have on the Abortion Act 1967, particularly in relation to the unborn disabled child.

Politicians from the unionist and nationalist parties in Northern Ireland joined forces on 20 June 2000 to block any extension of the Abortion Act 1967 to Northern Ireland where terminations were only allowed on a restricted basis.

Human Fertilisation and Embryology Act 2008 

There was widespread action across the country to oppose any attempts to restrict abortion access via the Human Fertilisation and Embryology Bill (now Act) in Parliament (Report Stage and Third Reading 22 October 2008). MPs voted to retain the current legal limit of 24 weeks. Amendments proposing reductions to 22 weeks and 20 weeks were defeated by 304 to 233 votes and 332 to 190 votes respectively.

A number of abortion rights amendments were proposed by Diane Abbott MP, Katy Clark MP and John McDonnell MP - including NC30 Amendment of the Abortion Act 1967: Application to Northern Ireland. However, it was reported that the Labour Government at the time asked MPs not to table these amendments (and at least until Third Reading) and then allegedly used parliamentary mechanisms in order to prevent a vote. Harriet Harman, in particular, was reported to have blocked the series of votes to liberalise Britain's abortion laws.

50th Anniversary of the Abortion Act 1967 (UK) 

In May 2017, the Labour Party under Jeremy Corbyn's leadership made a commitment to extend the Abortion Act 1967 to Northern Ireland. In June 2017, the UK Government revealed plans to provide some type of free abortion services in England for women from Northern Ireland in an attempt to head off a Conservative rebellion in a vote on the Queen's speech.

See also
Abortion in the United Kingdom

References

Further reading 

 
 Sheldon, Sally; Davis, Gayle; O'Neill, Jane; Parker, Clare (2022). The Abortion Act 1967: A Biography of a UK Law. Cambridge University Press

External links 

UK Parliament Inquiry: Scientific developments relating to the Abortion Act 1967, House of Commons Press Notice, 20 June 2007.

United Kingdom abortion law
United Kingdom Acts of Parliament 1967